Quintin John Goosen (4 November 1946 - 3 September 2014) was a Zimbabwean cricketer and umpire.  He umpired one Test match and 12 One Day Internationals, all played in Zimbabwe.

Goosen was born in Lonely Mine, Matabeleland.  He played cricket for Mashonaland Country Districts before becoming an umpire.  He was an umpire in the Logan Cup, Zimbabwe's domestic first-class cricket competition, from 1994 to 2002.

Goosen was an umpire in one Test match, the 2nd Test between Zimbabwe and Pakistan at the Queens Sports Club in Bulawayo in February 1995, paired with Sri Lankan umpire B.C. Cooray.  Pakistan won easily by 8 wickets within three days of the five-day match, but Pakistan bowler Wasim Akram was reprimanded after the Test for angrily snatching his cap from Goosen when an lbw appeal was rejected. The standard of umpiring in the Test was publicly criticised by Zimbabwean batsman David Houghton, who was also fined.

He also umpired 12 One Day International matches, all played in Zimbabwe between 1994 and 2001, six at Harare Sports Club and six at Queens Sports Club, Bulawayo.  He first stood in the 1st ODI between Zimbabwe and Sri Lanka at Harare on 3 November 1994, and his last ODI as umpire was the match between Zimbabwe and England at Bulawayo on 10 October 2001.

He died on 3 September 2014.

See also
 List of Test cricket umpires
 List of One Day International cricket umpires

References

External links
Profile from espncricinfo.com
Profile from cricketarchive.com

1946 births
2014 deaths
Sportspeople from Matabeleland North Province
Zimbabwean Test cricket umpires
Zimbabwean One Day International cricket umpires